Ian Edwards may refer to:

Ian Edwards (comedian) (born 1972), stand-up comedian
Ian Edwards (footballer, born 1955), Welsh football player
Ian Edwards, defendant in R v Brooks, Coulson and six others